Sports rivalries
Sports in Pennsylvania
Sports in Lancaster, Pennsylvania
Sports in York, Pennsylvania